Yulbashevo (Yulbaş) is a rural locality (a village) in Yalchinsky Selsoviet, Kugarchinsky District, Bashkortostan, Russia. The population was 35 as of 2010. There is 1 street.

Geography 
Yulbashevo is located 41 km northwest of Mrakovo (the district's administrative centre) by road. Yadgarovo is the nearest rural locality.

References 

Rural localities in Kugarchinsky District